Paul Winchell (né Wilchinsky; December 21, 1922 – June 24, 2005) was an American actor, comedian, humanitarian, inventor and ventriloquist whose career flourished in the 1950s and 1960s. From 1950 to 1954, he hosted The Paul Winchell Show, which also used two other titles during its prime time run on NBC: The Speidel Show, and What's My Name? From 1965 to 1968, Winchell hosted the children's television series Winchell-Mahoney Time.

Winchell made guest appearances on Emmy Award-winning television series from the late 1950s to the mid 1970s, such as Perry Mason, The Dick Van Dyke Show, McMillan & Wife, The Brady Bunch, The Donna Reed Show, and appearances as Homer Winch on The Beverly Hillbillies. In animation, he was the original voice of Tigger, Dick Dastardly, Gargamel, and other characters.

Winchell, who had medical training, was also an inventor, becoming the first person to build and patent a mechanical artificial heart, implantable in the chest cavity (US Patent #3097366 of 1963). He has been honored with a star on the Hollywood Walk of Fame for his work in television.

Early life 
Winchell was born Paul Wilchinsky in New York City on December 21, 1922, to Solomon Wilchinsky and Clara Fuchs. His father was a tailor; his grandparents were Jewish immigrants from Russian-ruled Poland and Austria-Hungary. Winchell's initial ambition was to become a physician, but the Great Depression wiped out any chance of his family's ability to afford medical school tuition. At age 6, his legs atrophied after contracting polio.

When Winchell was 12 or 13, he came across a magazine advertisement offering a ventriloquism kit for ten cents. Back at school, he asked his art teacher, Jero Magon, if he could receive class credit for creating a ventriloquist's dummy. Magon was agreeable, and Winchell thanked him named his creation Jerry Mahoney. Winchell went back to reading magazines, gathering jokes from them and putting together a comedy routine, which he then took to the Major Bowes Amateur Hour in 1938, winning first prize. A touring offer, playing various theaters with the Major Bowes Review, was part of the prize.  Bandleader Ted Weems saw the young Winchell while on tour; he visited Winchell and made him an offer of employment. Winchell accepted and became a professional at age 14.

Career

Ventriloquist work 

Winchell's best-known ventriloquist dummies were Jerry Mahoney and Knucklehead Smiff. Mahoney was carved by Chicago-based figure maker Frank Marshall. Sometime later Winchell had basswood copies of Jerry's head made by a commercial duplicating service. One became the upgraded Jerry Mahoney that is seen primarily throughout Winchell's television career. The television versions of Jerry and Knucklehead also featured Winchell's innovation of actors slipping their hands into the sleeves of the dummies, giving the visual effect of gesturing with their hands while "conversing" with each other. He modified two other copies to create Knucklehead Smiff. The original Marshall Jerry Mahoney and one copy of Knucklehead Smiff are in storage at the Smithsonian Institution. The other two figures are in the collection of illusionist David Copperfield.

Winchell's first show as a ventriloquist was on radio with Jerry Mahoney in 1943. The program was short-lived, however, as he was overshadowed by Edgar Bergen. Winchell also created Ozwald, a character that resembled Humpty Dumpty. The effect was accomplished by painting eyes and a nose on his chin, then adding a "body" covering the rest of his face, and finally electronically turning the camera image upside down. In 1961, Berwin Novelties introduced a home version of the character that included an Ozwald body, creative pencils to draw the eyes and nose and a "magic mirror" that automatically turned a reflection upside down.

In 1948, Winchell and Joseph Dunninger were featured on Floor Show on NBC. Recorded via kinescope and replayed on WNBQ-TV in Chicago, the 8:30-9 p.m. Central Time show on Thursdays was the station's first mid-week program.

During the 1950s, Winchell hosted children's (The Paul Winchell and Jerry Mahoney Show) and adult programs with his figures for NBC Television, and later for syndication. The NBC Saturday morning program, sponsored by Tootsie Roll, featured a clubhouse motif and a theme song co-written by Winchell and his longtime bandleader and on-air sidekick, Milton Delugg. The theme song was titled "HOORAY, HOORAH" which featured the secret password "SCOTTY WOTTY DOO DOO". An ending song titled "Friends, Friends, Friends" was sung by the children in the audience. In October 1956, Winchell moved to ABC, hosting Circus Time on Thursday evening for one season before returning to Winchell-Mahoney on Sunday afternoons. On one episode in late 1959, The Three Stooges appeared on the show to promote their joint feature film venture, Stop, Look and Laugh. Winchell made an appearance on Nanny and the Professor (Season 2, Episode 13) as a "mean old man" (a puppeteer who had retired into seclusion after losing his wife in an accident). In 1996, Winchell contracted with figure maker Tim Selberg to construct a more contemporary version of Jerry Mahoney, which Winchell described as "Disney-esque".  Winchell used the new figure version to pitch a new TV series idea to Michael Eisner. In 2009, Winchell was featured in the comedy documentary I'm No Dummy, directed by Bryan W. Simon.

Voice acting 
Winchell's career after 1968 included various voice roles for animated television series. For Hanna-Barbera, he played the character Dick Dastardly in multiple series (including Wacky Races and Dastardly and Muttley in their Flying Machines); Clyde and Softy on Wacky Races and The Perils of Penelope Pitstop; Fleegle on The Banana Splits Adventure Hour; and Gargamel on The Smurfs.

He also provided the voice of Bubi Bear in Help!... It's the Hair Bear Bunch! in 1971, Revs on Wheelie and the Chopper Bunch, Moe on The Robonic Stooges and Shake on The CB Bears. In 1973, he did the voice of Goober the Dog on the H-B show Goober and the Ghost Chasers and also guest starred as the rain-making villain on an episode of Hong Kong Phooey. For Disney, Winchell voiced Tigger in Disney's Winnie-the-Pooh featurettes, and won a Grammy Award for his performance in Winnie the Pooh and Tigger Too.

Beginning with the television series The New Adventures of Winnie the Pooh, he alternated in the role with Jim Cummings, the current voice of Pooh. Winchell's final performances as Tigger was in 1999 for Winnie the Pooh: A Valentine for You and The Many Adventures of Winnie the Pooh attraction at Walt Disney World. After that,  Jim Cummings permanently took over the role of Tigger starting with Sing a Song with Pooh Bear in 1999 (though some of Winchell's vocals from previous Pooh animations were included). Other Disney roles included parts in The Aristocats as a Siamese cat named Shun Gon, and The Fox and the Hound as Boomer the woodpecker. He was also the original voice of Zummi Gummi on the TV series Disney's Adventures of the Gummi Bears for seasons 1–5; Jim Cummings took over for the final season in 1990.

Winchell provided the voices of Sam-I-Am and the unnamed character Sam pesters in Green Eggs and Ham from the animated television special Dr. Seuss on the Loose in 1973. He played Fleabag on The Oddball Couple, Fearless Freddy the Shark Hunter on the Pink Panther spin-off Misterjaw in 1976, as well as a number of one-shot characters in The Blue Racer series. In commercials, he voiced the character of Burger Chef for the fast food chain of the same name, the Scrubbing Bubbles for Dow Chemicals and Mr. Owl for Tootsie Roll Pops.

From 1981 to 1989, Winchell voiced Gargamel on The Smurfs as well as on several Smurfs television movies. During the 1980s, he was called upon by Hanna-Barbera to reprise his role of Dick Dastardly on Yogi's Treasure Hunt (which was a tour-de-force featuring all of the H-B characters) and later on Wake, Rattle and Roll (which was a Wacky Races spin-off). Also on the animated movie Yogi Bear and the Magical Flight of the Spruce Goose, he did the voice of the Dread Baron, who was previously voiced by John Stephenson on the Laff-a-Lympics.

Live-action work 
Winchell (often with Jerry Mahoney) was a frequent guest panelist on What's My Line? in 1956. (On the April 29 episode, in which Winchell was a panelist, the mystery guest was Edgar Bergen; after his identity was revealed, Jerry Mahoney and Mortimer Snerd carried on a conversation.)  Other work included on-camera guest appearances on such series as The Polly Bergen Show; The Virginian; The Lucy Show; The Donna Reed Show; Dan Raven; The Brady Bunch; as Homer Winch on The Beverly Hillbillies; and as Claude Wilbur on The Dick Van Dyke Show. He appeared in a 1960 motion picture that included a compilation of Three Stooges shorts (Stop!, Look and Laugh), and also in the Jerry Lewis movie Which Way to the Front?.

Winchell appeared as himself in 1963 in the NBC game show Your First Impression. He appeared in the late 1960s in a sketch on Rowan and Martin's Laugh-in as a French ventriloquist named Lucky Pierre, who has the misfortune of having his elderly dummy die of a heart attack in the middle of his act. On Love, American Style, he appeared with fellow ventriloquist Shari Lewis in a sketch about two shy people in a waiting room who choose to introduce themselves to each other through their dummies.

Winchell-Mahoney Time 
Winchell's most successful TV show was Winchell-Mahoney Time (1965–1968), a children's show written by his wife, actress Nina Russel. Winchell played several onscreen characters, including Knucklehead Smiff's father, Bonehead Smiff. He also played himself as friend and adult advisor to Mahoney and Smiff. He also created "Mr. Goody-good," a surreal character, by painting eyes and a nose on his chin, covering his face with a small costume, then having the camera image inverted. The resulting pinheaded character seemed to have an immensely wide mouth and a highly mobile head. Winchell created this illusion by moving his chin back and forth. The show was produced at KTTV in Los Angeles, which was owned by Metromedia.

Winchell started "negotiating with Metromedia in 1970 to syndicate the 305 color segments of the show" but nothing came of it. Finally, "Winchell offered to purchase the tapes outright for $100,000. Metromedia responded with an ultimatum...: Agree on a syndication plan or the tapes will be destroyed."  When Winchell did not agree, Metromedia carried out with its threat and the tapes were erased and destroyed. Winchell sued Metromedia and in 1986 a jury awarded him "$3.8 million for the value of the tapes and $14 million in punitive damages against Metromedia." Metromedia appealed the award all the way to the Supreme Court but was unsuccessful.

Winchell's last regular on-camera TV appearances working with his puppets were Storybook Squares, a children's version of the adult celebrity game show Hollywood Squares which was seen Saturday mornings on NBC during the 1969 TV season, and Runaround, another children's TV game show seen Saturday mornings on NBC from September 1972 to September 1973.

Other pursuits

Medical and patents 
Winchell was a pre-med student at Columbia University. He graduated from The Acupuncture Research College of Los Angeles in 1974, and became an acupuncturist. He also worked as a medical hypnotist at the Gibbs Institute in Hollywood. He owned more than 30 patents in his lifetime. He invented an artificial heart with the assistance of Dr. Henry Heimlich, inventor of the Heimlich maneuver, and held an early U.S. patent for such a device. The University of Utah developed a similar apparatus around the same time, but when they tried to patent it, Winchell's patents were cited as prior art. Eventually, Winchell donated his heart patents to the university.

There is some debate as to how much of Winchell's design Robert Jarvik used in creating the Jarvik-7. Dr. Heimlich stated, "I saw the heart, I saw the patent and I saw the letters. The basic principle used in Winchell's heart and Jarvik's heart is exactly the same."  Jarvik denied that any of Winchell's design elements were incorporated into the his device, which was first successfully implanted in Barney Clark in 1982.

Winchell established more medical patents while working on projects for the Leukemia Society (now known as the Leukemia & Lymphoma Society) and the American Red Cross. Other devices that he invented and patented included a disposable razor, a blood plasma defroster, a flameless cigarette lighter, a garter belt with no outwardly visible lines, a fountain pen with a retractable tip, and battery-heated gloves.

As a philanthropist 
In the 1980s, Winchell's concern about starvation in Africa led him to develop a method to cultivate tilapia in tribal villages and small communities. The fish thrives in brackish waters, which made it particularly well suited for sub-Saharan Africa. Winchell appeared before a Congressional committee with several other celebrities, including actors Richard Dreyfuss and Ed Asner, and Dr. Heimlich. The committee declined to finance a pilot program for the tilapia aquaculture project in Africa because it required digging wells into non-potable water.

Personal life 

Winchell had three children: a son, Stacy Paul Winchell; a daughter, Stephanie, from his first marriage to Dorothy "Dottie" Movitz; and a daughter, April Winchell (the current voice of Clarabelle Cow), who is a comedian and voice actress, from his second marriage to actress Nina Russel. His third wife was the former Jean Freeman. Winchell's autobiography, Winch (2004), exposed many details of Winchell's life that had previously been kept private, including early stories of an abused childhood, a long history of depression and at least one mental breakdown which resulted in a short stint in an institution. The autobiography caused a major estrangement between Winchell and his children, prompting daughter April to publicly defend her mother, who was negatively portrayed in the book.

After writing in God 2000: Religion Without the Bible (1982) that religion brought more chaos to humanity than any "other invention of man", Winchell expressed deist opinions within his 2004 book Protect God.

Death 
Winchell died on June 24, 2005, at the age of 82, from natural causes in his sleep at his home in Moorpark, California, after years of recurring mental problems that came from his youth. 

He authored a large and detailed autobiography called "Winch The Autobiography" published April 2004, at age 81, which revealed the bad treatment he had from his mother for a considerable period, and the mental impact that continued to negatively affect him for decades after his mother's death (Clara Wilchinski died in 1953 when she was only 58 years old, and Paul was 30).  

He was survived by his wife, his children, and three grandchildren. His remains were cremated, and his ashes scattered over his home property. 

He was estranged from his children, and they were not immediately informed of his death. Upon learning of it, April posted an entry on her website:
I got a phone call a few minutes ago, telling me that my father passed away yesterday. A source close to my dad, or at least, closer than I was, decided to tell me himself, instead of letting me find out on the news, which I appreciate. Apparently a decision had been made not to tell me, or my father's other children. My father was a very troubled and unhappy man. If there is another place after this one, it is my hope that he now has the peace that eluded him on earth.

Jim Cummings took on the role of Tigger full-time starting with The Tigger Movie (2000) after Winchell was rejected by the studio as they thought at that time that his voice and energy sounds and felt too old for the role of the character (at the time of the production of this movie Winchell was 75/76 years old). Tom Kenny and Peter Woodward took on the role of Dick Dastardly and Hank Azaria, Rainn Wilson, and Mark Irons took on the role of Gargamel.

Filmography

Film

Television

Video games

Theme parks

References

External links 

 Obituary by Mark Evanier
 
 
 
 

1922 births
2005 deaths
20th-century American male actors
Acupuncturists
American hypnotists
American inventors
American male film actors
American male television actors
American male voice actors
American writers
Columbia University alumni
Disney people
Grammy Award winners
Hanna-Barbera people
High School of Art and Design alumni
Male actors from New York City
Ventriloquists